Legislative elections were held in Argentina on 14 November 2021. Half of the seats in the Chamber of Deputies and a third of the seats in the Senate were renewed. The election had previously been scheduled to take place on 24 October 2021, but was postponed due to the COVID-19 pandemic in Argentina.

Open, Simultaneous and Mandatory Primaries (PASO) were previously scheduled to take place on 8 August 2021, but took place on 12 September 2021, having also been postponed due to COVID-19. There were proposals, backed by the ruling Frente de Todos, to scrap the primaries altogether due to the COVID-19 pandemic. The proposals were opposed by the Juntos por el Cambio opposition. In June 2021, it was agreed to reschedule the primaries alongside the general election instead.

127 out of 257 seats in the lower chamber were renewed, while eight provinces (Catamarca, Chubut, Córdoba, Corrientes, La Pampa, Mendoza, Santa Fe and Tucumán) each renewed their 3 senators, in total accounting for 24 out of 72 seats in the upper chamber.

The main opposition alliance, Together for Change, was seen as the big winner of the election. The governing Frente de Todos suffered big losses, losing its majority in the Senate for the first time in almost 40 years, and seeing defeats in stronghold provinces such as Buenos Aires and La Pampa. Observers attributed the loss to the widespread anger over high inflation and rising poverty.

Background
Both executive and legislative offices were renewed in 2019 in Argentina; both elections were won by the Frente de Todos, a new coalition formed by a number of Peronist and Kirchnerist parties and alliances (chiefly the Justicialist Party and the Renewal Front) to support the presidential ticket of Alberto Fernández and former President Cristina Fernández de Kirchner (now Vice President). The Frente de Todos coalition won 64 out of 130 seats up for grabs in the lower house in the last election, thus currently accounting for 120 seats in the 2019–2021 period – 9 seats short of a majority.

The second minority and largest force in the opposition is the coalition formed to support former president Mauricio Macri: Juntos por el Cambio (formed by, among others, Republican Proposal, the Radical Civic Union and the Civic Coalition ARI), which won 56 seats in the Chamber of Deputies in 2019 and presently counts with 115 seats, following defections from its inter-bloc.

Impact of the COVID-19 pandemic
As early December 2020, the impact of the COVID-19 pandemic in Argentina prompted discussions on whether the 2021 elections, as well as the Open, Simultaneous and Mandatory Primaries (PASO) should be delayed and rescheduled. A majority of provincial governors (both from the governing Frente de Todos as well as from opposition parties), initially suggested scrapping the PASO primaries altogether. The Juntos por el Cambio-led opposition in Congress, however, opposed the measure and introduced a bill to forbid the national government from cancelling the primaries. The national executive, led by President Alberto Fernández, initially supported the measure, but later reached an agreement with Juntos por el Cambio to reschedule both the primaries and the legislative election for a month later. The new electoral calendar was published on 4 August 2021: the PASO primaries, originally scheduled for 8 August 2021, were rescheduled for 11 September 2021, while the legislative election, originally scheduled for 24 October 2021, were rescheduled for 14 November 2021.

In order to hold both elections, in which the all citizens between the ages of 18 and 70 are legally obligated to vote, the government and the National Electoral Chamber established a safety protocol which included a 30% increase of voting places and the vaccination of all electoral authorities. In addition, those who may exhibit COVID-19 symptoms or were in close contact with a positive case may be exempt from voting.

Electoral system

Chamber of Deputies 
The 257 members of the Chamber of Deputies are elected by proportional representation in 24 multi-member constituencies based on the provinces (plus the City of Buenos Aires). Seats are allocated using the d'Hondt method with a 3% electoral threshold. In this election, 127 of the 257 seats are up for renewal for a four-year term.

Senate 
The 72 members of the Senate are elected in the same 24 constituencies, with three seats in each. The party receiving the most votes in each constituency wins two seats, with the third seat awarded to the second-placed party. The 2021 elections will see one-third of Senators renewed, with eight provinces electing three Senators; Catamarca, Chubut, Córdoba, Corrientes, La Pampa, Mendoza, Santa Fe and Tucumán.

Current composition

Results

Primary elections

Open primary elections for legislative posts were held nationwide on 12 September. With this system, all parties run primary elections on a single ballot. All parties must take part in it, both the parties with internal factions and parties with a single candidate list. Citizens may vote for any candidate of any party, but may only cast a single vote. The candidate receiving the most votes, of each party gaining 1.5% or higher of the valid votes advances to the general election.

The results were largely negative for the governing Frente de Todos, which received around 30% of the popular vote nationwide and lost in traditionally Peronist-leaning provinces such as Buenos Aires, Chaco, La Pampa, Santa Cruz and Tierra del Fuego. With a nationwide aggregate of 42%, Juntos por el Cambio was the most voted alliance in 16 out of 23 provinces and in the City of Buenos Aires, while local parties won in Neuquén (MPN) and Río Negro (JSRN). Nationwide, the Workers' Left Front was the third-most voted alliance, with exceptionally good results in Jujuy (23.31%), the City of Buenos Aires (6.23%) and Buenos Aires Province (5.22%). In fourth place were the libertarian fronts "Avanza Libertad" and "La Libertad Avanza", which competed in Buenos Aires Province and the City of Buenos Aires (respectively) and received 6.85% of the vote overall, with a particularly strong result in the City, where the front became the third-largest force.

With a turnout of 66.21%, the 2021 primaries had the lowest participation since the implementation of the PASO system in 2011, and were the least-concurred nationwide elections since the return of democracy in 1983.

Chamber of Deputies 
At a press conference, the Minister of the Interior, Eduardo de Pedro, said electoral participation was around 71.72% of the electoral roll, a rise of five points compared to the 67% participation in the PASO, a historical minimum in those kinds of choices.

Argentina's main opposition party, Together for Change, was seen as the big winner of the election, gaining 42.13% of the vote and 61 out of the 127 seats. The Justicialist Party suffered big losses as its coalition lost its majority in the Senate for the first time since the return of democracy in 1983, as well as being defeated in its historical stronghold province of Buenos Aires.  Frente de Todos only gathered 34.17% of the vote, winning 50 out of the 127 seats, 11 seats behind Juntos por el Cambio. Observers attributed the loss to the widespread anger over high inflation and rising poverty.  FIT-U won 5.53 of the vote and 4 seats, an increase of 2 seats. Federal Consensus lost 3 seats, winning only 3 seats and 5.51% of the vote.

Results by province

Senate 
In the senate, Together for Change won 14 out of 24 seats available, making an increase of 5. Frente de Todos lost 4 seats, gathering only 9 seats. The last available seat went to Federal Consensus with FIT-U gaining none.

Results by province

Aftermath 
Argentina's President Alberto Fernández called for dialogue with the opposition after Sunday's midterm parliamentary elections, with the results showing his governing coalition has lost control of Congress. "An opposition that is responsible and open to dialogue is a patriotic opposition," Fernández  said, adding that he hoped for cooperation that would be "fruitful, for the general interests of the country."

Argentina's main opposition party, Together for Change, celebrated the victory in the legislative elections. Former president Mauricio Macri reacted, “The result confirms that it is the end of one era and the beginning of another". Macri continued saying, "These next two years are going to be difficult," while assuring voters that his coalition would "act with great responsibility."

The Argentinian peso went up in value following the opposition's win. Alberto Ramos, an analyst at Goldman Sachs, explained the rise: "The market is likely to take a net positive view of the election results. A more market-friendly composition of Congress could lead to more effective checks and balances and ultimately a policy regime shift in 2023".

References

Legislative
2021
Elections postponed due to the COVID-19 pandemic
November 2021 events in Argentina
Presidency of Alberto Fernández